The Club de Berne (CdB) is an intelligence sharing forum between the intelligence services of the 27 states of the European Union (EU), Norway and Switzerland, named after the city of Bern. It is an institution based on voluntary exchange of secrets, experience and views as well as discussing problems. The Club has existed since 1971 and has no secretariat and takes no decisions.

The Counter Terrorism Group (CTG) is an offshoot of the Club and shares terrorism intelligence. It provides threat assessments to EU policy makers and provides a form for expert collaboration.  The Group was created after 9/11 to further intelligence sharing cooperation between European intelligence structures. CTG, like the Club, is outside of the EU's institutions but communicates with them via the participation of the EU Intelligence Analysis Centre (EU INTCEN) (a branch of the European External Action Service). Although it is outside the EU, its presidency rotates inline with that of the EU Council presidency and acts as a formal interface between the Club de Berne and the EU.

See also
Joint European Union Intelligence School

References

Bodies of the Common Security and Defence Policy
Counterterrorist organizations